Akinkunmi Ayobami Amoo (born 7 June 2002) is a Nigerian professional footballer who plays as a midfielder for F.C. Copenhagen in the Danish Superliga.

Early life
Amoo was born in Ibadan, and started playing youth football at Brightville Academy. In his teens, he moved to Lagos to join Sidos FC.

Club career

Hammarby IF

2020
On 8 June 2020, shortly after his 18th birthday, Amoo transferred to Swedish club Hammarby IF on a four-year contract. In the process, he reportedly turned down a move to Monaco and Milan. Amoo made his competitive debut in Allsvenskan on 14 September, in a 2–2 home draw against Helsingborgs IF. On 10 November, Amoo scored a brace, his first competitive goals for Hammarby IF, in a 5–0 win against FC Gute in Svenska Cupen, the main domestic cup.

2021
In 2021, following the departure of Alexander Kačaniklić, Amoo established himself as a regular starter for Hammarby. On 7 March, he scored a long-range strike against rivals AIK in a 3–2 home win in Svenska Cupen, which meant that his side advanced to the quarter-finals of the tournament. On 17 April, Amoo scored his first league goal in Allsvenskan for the club, in a 2–0 home win against Mjällby AIF. On 30 May, Amoo won the 2020–21 Svenska Cupen with Hammarby, through a 5–4 win on penalties (0–0 after full-time) against BK Häcken in the final. He featured in all six games as the side reached the play-off round of the 2021–22 UEFA Europa Conference League, after eliminating Maribor (4–1 on aggregate) and FK Čukarički (6–4 on aggregate), where the club was knocked out by Basel (4–4 on aggregate) after a penalty shoot-out. Following his performances throughout the year, Amoo reportedly attracted interest from big European clubs like Ajax, Leicester and Valencia. He was one of three finalists for Allsvenskan young player of the year, that ultimately was awarded to Veljko Birmančević from Malmö FF.

F.C. Copenhagen
On 31 January 2022, Amoo signed a five-year deal with F.C. Copenhagen in the Danish Superliga. The fee was reportedly set at around €4.4 million, plus bonuses and a sell-on clause, making it a record breaking transfer for Hammarby. He also became one of Copenhagen's record arrivals, in the same region as Pep Biel and Ísak Bergmann Jóhannesson.

International career
Amoo began his international career with Nigeria in the 2019 Africa U-17 Cup of Nations, and scored in his debut in a 5–4 group stage win against Tanzania, where they finished fourth in the tournament. Later the same year, Amoo was part of the Nigerian squad that got knocked out in the round of 16 during the 2019 U-17 World Cup.

In early 2022, Amoo was sought out by Nigeria head coach Augustine Eguavoen for the 2021 Africa Cup of Nations, as a replacement for Odion Ighalo who had to withdraw from the tournament, but the call-up was not granted by the Confederation of African Football.

Style of play
A left-footed player, Amoo is known for his pace, ball control and technical ability. As an inverted winger, he is prone to dribble and cut inside from the flank. Due to his small stature, low centre of gravity and agility, Amoo has been compared with Lionel Messi in his native country, even gaining the nickname "portable" by his teammate Kelechi Iheanacho.

Career statistics

Honours
Hammarby IF
 Svenska Cupen: 2020–21

References

External links

2002 births
Living people
Nigerian footballers
Association football midfielders
Nigeria youth international footballers
Allsvenskan players
Hammarby Fotboll players
F.C. Copenhagen players
Nigerian expatriate footballers
Nigerian expatriate sportspeople in Sweden
Expatriate footballers in Sweden
Nigerian expatriate sportspeople in Denmark
Expatriate men's footballers in Denmark
Sportspeople from Ibadan